Category C may refer to:

 Category C Listed building (Scotland)
 Category C Prison (UK)
 Category C Bioterrorism agent
 Pregnancy Category C
 Category C services (Canadian television)
 A category of driving licence in the European Economic Area
 A category of driving licence in the United Kingdom
 A hooligan (Germany)
 The least serious category of disease recognized by the US Centers for Disease Control and Prevention